Ras GTPase-activating protein nGAP is an enzyme that in humans is encoded by the RASAL2 gene.

This gene encodes a protein that contains the GAP-related domain (GRD), a characteristic domain of GTPase-activating proteins (GAPs). GAPs function as activators of Ras superfamily of small GTPases. The protein encoded by this gene is able to complement the defective RasGAP function in a yeast system. Two alternatively spliced transcript variants of this gene encoding distinct isoforms have been reported.

References

Further reading